Lucius Cornelius Chrysogonus (died after 80 BC) was a Greek freedman of Lucius Cornelius Sulla whom Sulla put in charge of the proscriptions of 82 BC. He purchased the property of the proscribed Sextus Roscius Amerinus, worth 250 talents, for 2,000 denarii. Chrysogonus then accused Roscius's son, Sextus Roscius, of murdering his father.  In 80 BC Chrysogonus was in turn accused of corruption by Marcus Tullius Cicero, who was defending Sextus Roscius during his trial. Very little is known of Chrysogonus after the trial.

In popular culture
 Chrysogonus appears in Steven Saylor's first Roma Sub Rosa mystery novel, Roman Blood.
 Chrysogonus appears in Colleen McCullough's Masters of Rome series, most notably in The Grass Crown and Fortune's Favorites.
 Chrysogonus appears in "Murder in Rome", a TV documentary about Cicero's defense of a man accused of the murder of his father. Directed by Dave Stewart, 2005 - BBC.

Notes

Sources
 Smith, William, A Dictionary of Greek and Roman Biography and Mythology, Vol. I (1880).

1st-century BC Romans
Republican era slaves and freedmen
Cornelii
Sulla
80 BC deaths
Year of birth unknown
Place of birth unknown